Surya Kiran is an Indian director and actor who works in Telugu-language films. He is known for directing Satyam. Also, he participated in Telugu reality TV show Bigg Boss Telugu 4 as a contestant and is evicted on day 7.

Career 
He worked as a child actor in two-hundred films under the stage name Master Suresh. Surya Kiran made his directorial debut with the successful Satyam (2003) and went on to direct other Telugu-language films. In a review of Satyam, one critic praised his direction and called it a highlight of the film. He participated in the Telugu Reality television show Bigg Boss 4 and was the first contestant to get eliminated. He planned to make a comeback in the year 2017, but the film was stuck in development hell.

Personal life 
he was born to father T. S. Mani and mother Radha at Chennai, Tamilnadu. His family is from Trivandrum, Kerala. His younger sister  Sujitha Dhanush is also an actress.
He was briefly married to Kalyani before they divorced.

Partial filmography 
 As an actor
Mundhanai Mudichu (1983)
Rakshasudu (1986)
Donga Mogudu (1987)
Sankeertana (1987)
Khaidi No. 786 (1988)
Kondaveeti Donga (1990)

 As a director
Satyam (2003)
Dhana 51 (2005)
Brahmastram (2006)
Raju Bhai (2007)
Chapter 6 (2010)

 Television
Bigg Boss (Telugu season 4) (2020)

References 

Indian male child actors
Indian film directors
Telugu film directors
Year of birth missing (living people)
Living people
Bigg Boss (Telugu TV series) contestants
Male actors in Telugu cinema